The 1922 College Baseball All-Southern Team consists of baseball players selected at their respective positions after the 1922 NCAA baseball season.

All-Southerns

References

1922 NCAA baseball season
College Baseball All-Southern Teams